This is a list of notable RNLB coastal  rescue lifeboats.

Where applicable, their Official Number (or 'ON') is also given.

 RNLB H F Bailey III (ON 777)
 RNLB Lucy Lavers (ON 832)
 RNLB Forester’s Centenary (ON 786)
 RNLB Manchester Unity of Oddfellows (ON 960)
 RNLB J C Madge (ON 536)
 RNLB Alfred Corry (ON 353)
 RNLB Jesse Lumb (ON 822)
 RNLB Thomas McCunn (ON 759)
 RNLB Benjamin Bond Cabbell II (ON 12)
 RNLB Aguila Wren (ON 892)
 RNLB Helen Smitton (ON 603)
 RNLB William and Kate Johnstone (ON 682)
 
 
 
 
 
 RNLB Louisa Heartwell (ON 495)
 RNLB Mona (ON 775)
 RNLB Lester (ON 1287)
 RNLB Ruby and Arthur Reed II (ON 1097)
 RNLB Mary Stanford (ON 661)
 RNLB Mary Stanford (ON 733) 
 RNLB Harriot Dixon (ON 770)
 RNLB Lloyds II (ON 986)
 RNLB Ruby and Arthur Reed (ON 990)
 RNLB The Oddfellows (B-818)
 RNLB Cecil Paine (ON 850)
 RNLB Manchester Unity of Oddfellows (B-702)
 RNLB B-536
 RNLB William Bennett (ON 11)
 RNLB Duncan
 RNLB Guide of Dunkirk (ON 826)
 RNLB Lord Southborough (Civil Service No. 1) (ON 688)
 RNLB Abdy Beauclerk (ON 751)
 RNLB Julia Park Barry of Glasgow (ON 819)
 RNLB Spirit of Lowestoft (ON 1132)
 RNLB Freddie Cooper (ON 1193)
 RNLB Keith Anderson (ON 1106)
 RNLB Margaret Russell Fraser (ON 1108)
 RNLB Queen Victoria
 RNLB Emma Constance (ON 693)

See also 

 Royal National Lifeboat Institution (RNLI)

RNLB
Lifeboats,RNLB
RNLI
RNLI